The Milltown River is a river in Ireland. It flows from a small swampland in Milltownpass, a small village in the south of County Westmeath.

Historically the river featured a mill which was used to power the town. The village was one of the first villages in Ireland to be powered by electricity.

References

External links
Village plan

Rivers of County Westmeath